Bagheshlu may refer to:
 Bagheshlu, Ardabil
 Bagheshlu, East Azerbaijan